Nicolas Charbonnier (born 4 August 1981) is a French sailor who won a bronze medal at the 2008 Summer Olympics in Beijing, China. He is 4 time World Champion, 3 time European Champion and "alinghi" team's tactician (Décision 35 and GC 32 Racing).

References

External links
 
 
 
 

1981 births
Living people
French male sailors (sport)
Olympic sailors of France
Olympic bronze medalists for France
Olympic medalists in sailing
Sailors at the 2008 Summer Olympics – 470
Medalists at the 2008 Summer Olympics
420 class world champions
470 class sailors
Alinghi sailors
Extreme Sailing Series sailors
World champions in sailing for France